Edmund FitzAlan may refer to:
Edmund FitzAlan, 2nd Earl of Arundel (1285–1326)
Edmund FitzAlan, 9th Earl of Arundel
Edmund FitzAlan, 10th Earl of Arundel
Edmund FitzAlan, 11th Earl of Arundel

See also
Edmund FitzAlan-Howard, 1st Viscount FitzAlan of Derwent